Kampong Kebia is a village in Tutong District, Brunei. The population was 733 in 2016. It is one of the villages within Mukim Kiudang, a mukim subdivision in the district.

References 

Kebia